The Kosovo Longcrower or Kosovo Long Crowing Rooster is a breed of chicken originating in Kosovo. It developed as a landrace in the area of the Drenica in Kosovo, and thus in the Albanian language it is commonly called Rooster of Drenica.

Origin and distribution
The breed originated in the region of Kosovo and surrounding areas. Before 2011 it was a rarely kept breed, however it is now widely kept across Europe. Due to its unique feature (long crowing) it became popular between poultry breeders. From Kosovo this breed spread into other Balkan countries as well. Nowadays, it is found in Kosovo.

Description

The birds are black. The rooster might have a few red or gold feathers on the wings. Over time, white spots can occur on its feathers, which is a sign of aging. On the head there is a characteristic crest of black feathers. There might be two symmetrical short horns on its nose, like the horns of a goat. In most cases their V-shaped comb (crest) leans forward. Its beak is yellow (or gold), or even white, whereas the feet are mainly olive-green, as well as gray. The types that have green feet always have a yellow-gold beak, and their song lasts, or even exceeds, 1 minute. The rooster's tail has some longer sword shaped feathers and it is held straight (horizontal with the body).

The roosters weigh 2–3.25 kg and the hens from 1.5–2 kg. The hens are nonsitters, and produce 160 white eggs per year of 55–60 g weight. A chicken starts to produce eggs when eight months old. Chicks hatch out brown.

Crow
This breed belongs to the group of long-crowing chicken breeds. Their crow averages 20–40 seconds, exceptional birds will go on for 60 seconds. The cock starts to crow when six to seven months old.

References

Further reading
 Proposed Standard of the Kosova Long Crowing Rooster (in Albanian)

Chicken breeds originating in Kosovo
Long-crowing chickens
Chicken breeds
Drenica